Anna Cooke Kendrick (born August 9, 1985) is an American actress and singer. Her first starring role was in the 1998 Broadway musical High Society, for which she earned a nomination for the Tony Award for Best Featured Actress in a Musical. She made her film debut in the musical comedy Camp (2003), and had a supporting role in The Twilight Saga (2008–2012). She achieved wider recognition for the comedy-drama film Up in the Air (2009), which earned her a nomination for the Academy Award for Best Supporting Actress, and for her starring role in the Pitch Perfect film series (2012–2017).

Kendrick has also starred in the comedies Scott Pilgrim vs. the World (2010) and 50/50 (2011), the crime drama End of Watch (2012), the musical fantasy Into the Woods (2014), and the thrillers The Accountant (2016) and A Simple Favor (2018). She has also performed a voice role in the animated musical films Trolls (2016) and Trolls World Tour (2020). For starring in the short form series Dummy, she received a nomination for a Primetime Emmy Award for Outstanding Actress.

Kendrick has sung on various soundtracks for her films, including the single "Cups" in 2012, as well as at events like the 2013 Kennedy Center Honors and the 2015 Academy Awards. Her memoir, Scrappy Little Nobody, was published in 2016.

Early life 
Kendrick was born in Portland, Maine, on August 9, 1985, the daughter of accountant Janice (née Cooke) and history teacher William Kendrick. Her father has also worked in finance. She is of English, Irish, and Scottish descent. She has an older brother who is an actor and appeared in the drama film Looking for an Echo (2000). She attended Deering High School.

Career

1998–2007: Early career, theater, and film debut 

Kendrick started her career as a child, auditioning for theater productions in New York City. When she was 12, she had a supporting role in the 1998 Broadway musical High Society. Her performance earned her a Theater World Award and nominations for Featured Actress in a Musical at the Drama Desk Awards and Tony Awards. She went on to a supporting role in the 2003 New York City Opera production of Stephen Sondheim's musical A Little Night Music.

She made her film debut in the musical film Camp. Her performance as nerdy Fritzi Wagner earned her a nomination for the Independent Spirit Award for Best Debut Performance. She played an ambitious high school debater in Rocket Science (2007), for which she earned a Independent Spirit Award nomination for Best Supporting Female.

2008–2011: Twilight and Up in the Air 
Kendrick rose to prominence in 2008 for the fantasy romance Twilight, a major box-office hit based on Stephenie Meyer's 2005 novel of the same name; Kendrick played Jessica Stanley, a friend of protagonist Bella Swan. In 2009, she appeared in the comedy The Marc Pease Experience, in her first leading role in the crime thriller Elsewhere, and reprised her Jessica Stanley role in Twilight's sequel, New Moon.

She then starred alongside George Clooney in director Jason Reitman's Up in the Air (2009). Critics praised her performance as an ambitious college graduate, calling it "funny and touching" and saying that she "grabs every scene she's in". It brought her nominations for several Best Supporting Actress awards, including the Academy Awards, Golden Globe Awards, Screen Actors Guild Awards and BAFTA Awards.

In 2010, Kendrick again portrayed Jessica Stanley in the Twilight saga's third installment, Eclipse. Later that year, she appeared in Scott Pilgrim vs. the World, as the sister of the title character. The film did not fare well at the box office, but has since become a cult classic. In 2011, she appeared in the critically acclaimed comedy-drama 50/50, as an inexperienced therapist to a cancer patient played by Joseph Gordon-Levitt. Later that year, she made her final appearance as Jessica Stanley in Twilight's fourth installment, Breaking Dawn – Part 1 (2011).

Kendrick has been a member of the Actors' Branch of the Academy of Motion Picture Arts and Sciences since 2010.

2012–2015: Pitch Perfect and Into the Woods 
In 2012, Kendrick featured as part of the ensemble cast of What to Expect When You're Expecting, loosely based on the pregnancy guide of the same name. Also that year, she lent her voice to the stop-motion animated film ParaNorman, starred in the commercially successful crime drama End of Watch, and appeared in Robert Redford's political thriller The Company You Keep.

Kendrick's most successful film of 2012 was the musical comedy Pitch Perfect (2012), loosely based on the non-fiction book Pitch Perfect: The Quest for Collegiate A Cappella Glory. Kendrick played Beca Mitchell, a rebellious college freshman who joins an a cappella group called the Barden Bellas and finds that her more modern approach to music clashes with the traditional approach of the group's leader. The film emerged as a major commercial success and received mostly positive reviews from critics, who called Kendrick's performance "splendid", saying that she "hits just the right note between pithy and chummy".

In 2013, Kendrick featured in the romantic comedy-drama Drinking Buddies, which received mostly positive reviews from critics, as well as the largely panned fantasy comedy Rapture-Palooza.

At the Sundance Film Festival in January 2014, Kendrick was featured in three films. She played leading roles in the comedy-drama Happy Christmas and the horror comedy The Voices, which both received generally favorable reviews from critics, as well as a supporting role in the zombie comedy Life After Beth. Both Happy Christmas and Life After Beth received limited releases later in 2014, while The Voices was given a limited release in early 2015.

At the Toronto International Film Festival in September 2014, Kendrick was featured in two films. She starred in the musical romance The Last Five Years, an adaptation of the off-Broadway musical of the same name. While the film itself received mixed reviews, Kendrick garnered widespread critical acclaim for her performance. She also played a supporting role in the comedy-drama Cake. Cake was eventually given a wide release in January 2015, while The Last Five Years received a limited release in February 2015.

Kendrick was next seen playing Cinderella in Disney's Into the Woods (2014), director Rob Marshall's film adaptation of Stephen Sondheim's musical of the same name. Kendrick was a part of the large ensemble cast. The film became a major commercial success and received mostly positive reviews from critics.

Kendrick competed in the first season of Lip Sync Battle against John Krasinski, one of the show's executive producers, in an episode aired in April 2015. She first performed "Steal My Girl" by One Direction, in which she jokingly revealed the object of her affection to be Krasinski's newlywed wife, Emily Blunt. During her performance, Kendrick stares adoringly at images of Blunt on a monitor while sporting a t-shirt imprinted with a heart-shaped photograph of her and Blunt together. Kendrick also performed "Booty" by Jennifer Lopez, in which she makes a surprise appearance at the end of the song. Krasinski performed "Bye Bye Bye" by NSYNC and "Proud Mary" by Ike & Tina Turner. The audience declared Kendrick the winner. The episode garnered over 1.75 million U.S. viewers.

Kendrick played a supporting role in Digging for Fire, which premiered at the 2015 Sundance Film Festival and received a limited release in August of that year. In May 2015, she reprised her role of Beca Mitchell in Pitch Perfect 2. The film, which followed Mitchell in her senior year of college as the co-president of the Barden Bellas, emerged as a major box office blockbuster and surpassed the success of the first film.

2016–present: Trolls franchise and other projects

Kendrick starred in the action comedy Mr. Right, which premiered at the 2015 Toronto International Film Festival and was released on April 8, 2016. She also starred in The Hollars, a comedy-drama directed by and starring John Krasinski, which premiered at the 2016 Sundance Film Festival, and was theatrically released in August 2016. She was then seen in the coming-of-age film Get a Job, which received a limited release in March 2016 after being delayed since 2012.

Also in 2016, Kendrick starred in the commercially successful comedy Mike and Dave Need Wedding Dates, voiced Princess Poppy, the main character of the animated film Trolls, and co-starred in the action thriller The Accountant. Kendrick's memoir Scrappy Little Nobody was published on November 15, 2016.

Kendrick starred in Table 19, which was released March 3, 2017. She again reprised the role of Beca Mitchell in Pitch Perfect 3, released on December 22, 2017. In September 2018, she starred as Stephanie Smothers in the mystery-thriller film A Simple Favor. Also in September 2018, Kendrick began appearing in a series of advertisements across a range of media for Hilton Hotels.

In 2019, Kendrick co-starred in the satirical crime comedy The Day Shall Come and played the titular character in the Disney+ Christmas comedy Noelle. Kendrick also voiced a character in the Facebook Watch adult animated comedy series Human Discoveries.

Also in 2019, it was announced that Kendrick would star as a state trooper with irreversible hearing loss in Unsound, directed by Bharat Nalluri.

Kendrick reprised her role as Poppy in the 2020 sequel Trolls World Tour. Due to the COVID-19 pandemic, Universal Pictures released the film via video on-demand platforms as a digital rental on April 10, 2020. She starred in the Quibi comedy series Dummy, for which she also served as executive producer. For her performance, she was nominated for the Primetime Emmy Award for Outstanding Actress in a Short Form Comedy or Drama Series. Also in 2020, Kendrick starred in the HBO Max romantic comedy anthology series Love Life, for which she additionally served as an executive producer. She appeared next as the lead in Stowaway, a science-fiction thriller which was released on April 22, 2021.

Personal life 
Kendrick resides in Los Angeles. 

In an interview with Terry Gross on NPR, Kendrick said she was raised Episcopalian, but as a child she was terrified of certain passages in the Old Testament. She stopped attending church at the age of fourteen.

She began dating English filmmaker Edgar Wright in 2009, after they met while filming Scott Pilgrim vs. the World. They split up in March 2013. She began dating English cinematographer Ben Richardson in February 2014, after they met while filming Drinking Buddies. That relationship has since ended.

Kendrick began dating actor Bill Hader in late 2020 or early 2021. By June 2022, they had ended their relationship.

She has said that her experience in an emotionally abusive relationship inspired her performance in Alice, Darling.

Kendrick's father, William King Kendrick, died on November 16, 2022 of end-stage liver cirrhosis. He was 75.

Filmography

Film

Television

Music videos

Theatre

Discography

Singles

Other featured performances

Bibliography

Awards and nominations

Throughout her career, for her work on screen and stage, Kendrick has received several awards and nominations. Among them, she is one of the few actors to have been nominated for an Oscar, Emmy and Tony in acting categories, labeled the "Triple Crown of Acting".

Tony Award (1998) nomination for Best Featured Actress in a Musical, for High Society
Academy Award (2009) nomination for Best Supporting Actress, for Up in the Air
Primetime Emmy Award (2020) nomination for Outstanding Actress in a Short Form Series, for Dummy

Achieving the feat at age 34, she is one of the youngest people to do so, and one of few to be nominated for all three awards without winning one.

Kendrick's other accolades include three MTV Movie & TV Awards, a Satellite Award and nominations for a BAFTA, Golden Globe and SAG Award.

References

External links 

 
 

1985 births
20th-century American actresses
20th-century American singers
20th-century American women singers
21st-century American actresses
21st-century American singers
21st-century American women writers
21st-century American women singers
Actresses from Portland, Maine
American autobiographers
American child actresses
American women pop singers
American film actresses
21st-century American memoirists
American people of English descent
American people of Irish descent
American people of Scottish descent
American former Protestants
American stage actresses
American television actresses
American sopranos
American voice actresses
American women memoirists
Deering High School alumni
Living people
Singers from Maine
Theatre World Award winners
Women autobiographers